Mysteries at the Castle (formerly Castle Secrets & Legends) is an American reality television series that premiered on January 19, 2014, on the Travel Channel. The series features the secrets and legends "behind the gates and walls" of castles, mansions and manor houses around the world. The first-season episodes aired on Sundays at 10:00pm, while the second and third-season episodes were moved to Fridays at 9:00pm EST. It was then moved to Thursdays at 9:00pm EST in the middle of the third season.

Note: In season 2, which premiered on January 2, 2015, the series name was changed to Mysteries at the Castle.

Premise
Each episode includes dramatic recreations featuring actors re-telling the most mysterious, secret and strange stories and legends from a castle's history. These stories have occurred either inside the fortifications or near the many famous and even infamous castles in Europe and America.

Series Overview

Episodes

Season 1 (2014)

Season 2 (2015)
Note: Episodes in this season aired under the changed title name Mysteries at the Castle.

Season 3 (2016)

References

External links

2014 American television series debuts
2010s American documentary television series
Travel Channel original programming
Television series featuring reenactments
2016 American television series endings